Six ships (and one shore establishment) of the Royal Navy have borne the name HMS Sphinx or HMS Sphynx, after the mythical creature, the Sphinx:

 was a 24-gun sixth rate launched in 1748 and sold in 1770.
 was a 20-gun sixth rate launched in 1775. The French captured her in September 1779, but  recaptured her on 29 November 1779. She was broken up in 1811.
 was a 10-gun  launched in 1815 that became a Post Office Packet Service packet, sailing out of Falmouth, Cornwall. She was sold in 1835.
 was a wooden paddle sloop launched in 1846 and broken up in 1881.
HMS Sphinx (1882) was a composite paddle vessel launched in 1882 and sold in 1919.
 was an  launched in 1939 that foundered in 1940 after an air attack.
 HMS Sphinx was the name given to a naval accommodation camp in Alexandria, Egypt, from April 1941.

Citations

References
Demerliac, Alain (1996) La Marine De Louis XVI: Nomenclature Des Navires Français De 1774 À 1792. (Nice: Éditions OMEGA). 

Royal Navy ship names